The Sound of Music is a 1959 musical by Rodgers and Hammerstein.

The Sound of Music may also refer to:

Arts, entertainment, and media

Adaptations and the soundtrack of the 1959 musical
 "The Sound of Music" (song), title song from the 1959 musical
 The Sound of Music (film), the 1965 film adaptation of the musical
 The Sound of Music (soundtrack), the soundtrack album to the 1965 film (#1 selling UK album for 1965, 1966 & 1968)
 The Sound of Music (1988 cast album)
 The Sound of Music Live!, a 2013 U.S. television production based on the original stage musical
 The Sound of Music: Music from the NBC Television Event, studio recording by the 2013 television cast
 The Sound of Music Live (2015), a 2015 UK television production based on the original stage musical

Music

Albums
 Sound of Music (album), a 1982 recording by The Adicts
 The Sound of Music (The dB's album), released in 1987
 The Sound of Music, a Christine Fan album released in 2003
 The Sound of Music by Pizzicato Five, a compilation album released in 1995
 The Sound of Music (An Unfinished Symphony in 12 Parts), released in 1999
 The Sound of Music (Laibach album), an album by Laibach released in 2018

Songs
 "The Sound of Music", a song by Joy Division released on the album Still (1981)
 "Sound of Music", a song by US group Dayton released on the album Feel the Music (1983)
 "The Sound of Musik", a song by Austrian pop musician Falco from his album Emotional (1986)

Enterprises
 Sound of Music (punk club), a defunct music venue in San Francisco, California, U.S.
 Sound of Music, a retail chain founded in 1966 and renamed Best Buy in 1983

See also
 The Sound of Musicals, a 2006 BBC series of musical performances
 The Sound of Silence (disambiguation)